Eddy County is a county located in the U.S. state of New Mexico. As of the 2010 census, the population was 53,829. Its county seat and largest city is Carlsbad. The county was created in 1891 and later organized in 1892. It is north of the Texas state line.

Eddy County comprises the Carlsbad-Artesia, NM Micropolitan Statistical Area.

Carlsbad Caverns National Park is located in this county. Eddy County is the location of the Waste Isolation Pilot Plant.

History
In 1866, Charles Goodnight and Oliver Loving drove vast herds of cattle along the Pecos and set up "cow camps" in Seven Rivers and what is now Carlsbad. John Chisum soon joined them and brought an estimated 100,000 head of cattle of his own through the Pecos Valley.

In 1881, Charles B. Eddy came to the area, and with his brother, John, and partner Amos Bissell, developed the Eddy-Bissell Cattle Company.  In 1884, the Eddy brothers and Bissell broke ground on the Halagueno Ranch which encompassed an area from Seven Rivers to La Huerta (a suburb of Carlsbad).  In 1887, Eddy built the Halagueno diversion ditch on the Pecos, three miles above the site of the Avalon Dam (which was completed in 1890) and incorporated the venture, calling it the Pecos Valley Land and Ditch Company. Eddy was looking to entice Europeans to settle the area, and with the new Halagueno Ranch and the Pecos Valley Land and Ditch Company established, he sought funds from a Swiss bank to help attract them to the clean air and sunny climate.

In 1888, Patrick Garrett (known as the sheriff who had shot Billy the Kid) along with promoter Charles Greene, joined forces with Eddy to design and build a system of canals and flumes to divert water to their ranches and properties. Greene was able to procure investors from the east, one of which was Robert W. Tansill (manufacturer of the "Punch 5 ¢ Cigar"). These men, along with another big investor, J.J. Hagerman, laid the plans for a new town on the west bank of the Pecos River.  The men had the town incorporated as Eddy on September 15, 1888.

The county was named for cattle rancher Charles B. Eddy. When the territorial legislature set the boundaries of Eddy County, in 1889, Seven Rivers was named the county seat. During an election in 1890 for new county commissioners, a referendum was on the ballot to change the seat from Seven Rivers to the town of Eddy. The referendum passed by a vote of 331 to 83.  In that year, the census said Eddy had only 278 people and they cast 241 of the winning votes. The referendum also included the building of a courthouse.  Charles Eddy donated the land which consisted of an entire town block.  The county commissioners authorized a contract for $30,000 to build a brick courthouse. (In 1899, the town of Eddy changed its name to Carlsbad.)

On January 10, 1891, the first railroad train on the new Pecos Valley Railroad arrived in Eddy, from Pecos, Texas. Crops of cotton and alfalfa (which were found to be the perfect crops for the Eddy County area), along with cattle, sheep, wool, and people, could be moved into and out of the area with ease, now. This brought more investors and many more settlers into the area.

In 1902, Carlsbad Caverns were discovered about 18 mi (29 km) southwest of Carlsbad town. The discovery is still disputed between Jim White and Abijah Long. The caves are now known as Carlsbad Caverns National Park. The caverns have brought many millions of visitors from around the world into Eddy County.

Oil was discovered in Eddy County in 1909, near the town of Dayton (8 mi south of Artesia). Another big oil strike happened in 1923, when Martin Yates Jr., purchased a well near Artesia, and southeastern New Mexico was said to be "gushing oil!". Drilling commenced at a furious pace and by 1938, the area's oil production was valued at $32 million annually.

In 1925, a geologist, Dr. V. H. McNutt, discovered major deposits of potash, while looking for oil east of Carlsbad. This ushered in a "boom" in potash mining, and several large potash producers set up business in the area.

Geography
The lowest point in the state of New Mexico is located on the Red Bluff Reservoir in Eddy County, where the impounded Pecos River flows out of New Mexico and into Texas.

Adjacent counties
 Otero County - west
 Chaves County - north
 Lea County - east
 Loving County, Texas - southeast
 Reeves County, Texas - south
 Culberson County, Texas - south

National protected areas
 Carlsbad Caverns National Park
 Lincoln National Forest (part)

Demographics

2000
As of the 2000 census, 51,658 people, 19,379 households, and 14,069 families resided in the county.  The population density was 12 people per square mile (5/km2).  The 22,249 housing units averaged 5 per square mile (2/km2).  The racial makeup of the county was 76.34% White, 1.56% Black or African American, 1.25% Native American, 0.45% Asian, 0.09% Pacific Islander, 17.67% from other races, and 2.64% from two or more races.  About 38.76% of the population were Hispanic or Latino of any race.

Of the 19,379 households, 35.60% had children under the age of 18 living with them, 56.10% were married couples living together, 11.90% had a female householder with no husband present, and 27.40% were not families. About 24.20% of all households were made up of individuals, and 10.70% had someone living alone who was 65 years of age or older.  The average household size was 2.63 and the average family size was 3.12.

In the county, the population was distributed as 28.90% under the age of 18, 8.40% from 18 to 24, 25.70% from 25 to 44, 22.40% from 45 to 64, and 14.70% who were 65 years of age or older.  The median age was 36 years. For every 100 females, there were 95.90 males.  For every 100 females age 18 and over, there were 92.70 males.

The median income for a household in the county was $31,998, and for a family was $36,789. Males had a median income of $31,909 versus $19,686 for females. The per capita income for the county was $15,823.  About 13.60% of families and 17.20% of the population were below the poverty line, including 21.50% of those under age 18 and 13.40% of those age 65 or over.

2010 census
As of the 2010 census, there were 53,829 people, 20,411 households, and 14,292 families residing in the county. The racial makeup of the county was 77.4% white, 1.5% American Indian, 1.4% black or African American, 0.7% Asian, 16.0% from other races, and 3.0% from two or more races. Those of Hispanic or Latino origin made up 44.1% of the population. In terms of ancestry, 10.8% were German, 8.8% were Irish, 8.5% were English, and 7.0% were American.

Of the 20,411 households, 35.7% had children under the age of 18 living with them, 50.3% were married couples living together, 13.0% had a female householder with no husband present, 30.0% were non-families, and 25.5% of all households were made up of individuals. The average household size was 2.59 and the average family size was 3.08. The median age was 37.3 years.

The median income for a household in the county was $46,583 and the median income for a family was $56,646. Males had a median income of $49,788 versus $30,158 for females. The per capita income for the county was $24,587. About 9.2% of families and 13.6% of the population were below the poverty line, including 16.7% of those under age 18 and 10.6% of those age 65 or over.

Communities

Cities
 Artesia
 Carlsbad (county seat)

Villages
 Hope
 Loving

Census-designated places

 Atoka
 Happy Valley
 La Huerta
 Livingston Wheeler
 Loco Hills
 Malaga
 Morningside
 Whites City

Ghost Towns
 Avalon
 Barber Crossing
 Four Forks
 Four Wells
 Harkey Crossing
 Hunter Place
 Lookout
 Red Bluff
 Illinois Camp
 Three Forks

Politics
For much of the first half of the 20th century, Eddy was a Democratic stronghold. Then it became a Republican-leaning swing county until the turn of the century. Since then, it has become a Republican stronghold, like most plains counties. Donald Trump's 2020 performance of over 75% in the county is the strongest victory for any Republican in county history.

Education
School districts serving portions of the county include:
 Artesia Public Schools
 Carlsbad Municipal Schools
 Loving Municipal Schools

See also
 National Register of Historic Places listings in Eddy County, New Mexico

References

External links
 Eddy County Official Website

 
1891 establishments in New Mexico Territory
Populated places established in 1891